Yangpyeong Station is Line 5 subway station in Seoul, South Korea. The station lies near Yeouido and there are many apartment complexes. In fact, the confirmation was allowed to rebuild old complex.

This station shares a name with Yangpyeong Station on the Gyeongui-Jungang Line in Yangpyeong, Gyeonggi-do.

Station layout

Entrance
 Exit 1 : Dangjoong elementary school, Yangpyeong dong Street No.3
 Exit 2 : Yangpyeong 1 dong office, Gwanak elementary school

References

Seoul Metropolitan Subway stations
Railway stations opened in 1996
Metro stations in Yeongdeungpo District